Angel Gardens is a  tall, 35-storey building of 466 rental apartments in Manchester, England. It forms part of the  NOMA redevelopment. In January 2017, the investor Apache Capital Partners and the developer Moda Living secured £85 million in financing from the German bank Deutsche Pfandbriefbank.

Following the collapse of the main contractor Carillion on 15 January 2018, construction was put on hold; two weeks later, the contract was transferred to Caddick Construction and construction re-commenced.

Angel Gardens was co-designed by architects Fuse Studios and HAUS Collective.

Construction progress

References

Buildings and structures in Manchester